This is page shows results of Canadian federal elections in Midwestern Ontario, which is roughly from Woodstock to Milton, and from Lake Erie to Goderich.

Regional profile
Before the late 1950s, Midwestern Ontario had not leaned towards either the Progressive Conservatives (Tories) or the Liberals (Grits) on a regular basis as there was wide variation in each party's results from election to election. Since the late 1950s, however, it has been a primarily conservative-voting area. Even when the Liberals won every federal election except one from 1963 to 1980 inclusive, the Progressive Conservatives usually won the majority of seats in this region, and in the 1979 Progressive Conservative election plurality, the only seat the Tories did not win was won by the New Democrats (NDP). The NDP usually claimed one seat from the mid-1960s until the 1993 election, usually in the riding of Brant.

Vote splitting allowed the Liberals to win all of the seats in Midwestern Ontario from 1993 to 2000 in their province-wide sweeps, although one seat was lost to the Conservative Party (which replaced the Progressive Conservatives) in a 2003 by-election. The Conservatives picked up four more seats in the 2004 election, another in the 2006 election, and four more in 2008, leaving Guelph as the only non-Conservative seat in the region from 2008 to 2015. In the 2015 Liberal majority government win, the Conservatives still took one more seat in the area than the Liberals as they swept the rural areas.

The Conservatives are weaker in the larger cities of  Kitchener-Waterloo and Guelph, partly because they have prominent universities (University of Waterloo, University of Guelph, Wilfrid Laurier University) with large student populations. The Liberals retained three of the four ridings in those cities by significant margins in 2006 despite the Conservatives forming the government, and won four of the five seats available there in the 2015 election, the exceptions in both elections being the partially rural Kitchener-Conestoga riding, although both wins in the riding were only narrow victories for the Conservatives. Even in the 2008 election victory by the Conservatives, the ridings of Kitchener Centre and Kitchener-Waterloo were only won by the Conservatives by less than 300 votes. The riding of the more suburban city of Cambridge has generally leaned Conservative dating back decades whereas the riding of Brant-Brantford has switched from being strongly NDP to Liberal to Conservative in the last three decades.

In 2019 the Greens were able to gain over 25 percent of the vote in two urban ridings, Guelph and Kitchener Centre. However, the Liberals held both seats by over a 10% margin.

2015 - 42nd General Election

2011 - 41st General Election

2008 - 40th General Election

2006 - 39th General Election

2004 - 38th General Election

|-
|bgcolor=whitesmoke|Brant
||
|Lloyd St. Amand20,45538.05%
|
|Greg Martin17,79233.10%
|
|Lynn Bowering11,82622.00%
|
|Helen-Anne Embry2,7385.09%
|
|Barra L. Gots5701.06%
|
|John C. Turmel (Ind.)3730.69%
||
|Jane Stewart†
|-
|rowspan=2 bgcolor=whitesmoke|Cambridge
|rowspan=2 |
|rowspan=2 |Janko Peric18,89936.65%
|rowspan=2 |
|rowspan=2 |Gary Goodyear19,12337.09%
|rowspan=2 |
|rowspan=2 |Gary Price10,39220.15%
|rowspan=2 |
|rowspan=2 |Gareth M. White2,5064.86%
|rowspan=2 |
|rowspan=2 |John G. Gots3950.77%
|
|Alex W. Gryc (Ind.)114 0.22%
|rowspan=2 |
|rowspan=2 |Janko Peric
|-
|
|John Oprea (Ind.)134 0.26%
|-
|rowspan=2 bgcolor=whitesmoke|Guelph
|rowspan=2 |
|rowspan=2 |Brenda Chamberlain23,44244.61%
|rowspan=2 |
|rowspan=2 |Jon Dearden13,72126.11%
|rowspan=2 |
|rowspan=2 |Phil Allt10,52720.03%
|rowspan=2 |
|rowspan=2 |Mike Nagy3,8667.36%
|rowspan=2 |
|rowspan=2 |Peter Ellis6341.21%
|
|Manuel Couto (M-L)66 0.13%
|rowspan=2 |
|rowspan=2 |Brenda Chamberlain
|-
|
|Lyne Rivard (Mar.)291 0.55%
|-
|bgcolor=whitesmoke|Haldimand—Norfolk
|
|Bob Speller19,33638.84%
||
|Diane Finley20,98142.15%
|
|Carrie Sinkowski7,14314.35%
|
|Colin Jones1,7033.42%
|
|Steven Elgersma6171.24%
|
|
||
|Bob Speller
|-
|bgcolor=whitesmoke|Huron—Bruce
||
|Paul Steckle25,53849.79%
|
|Barb Fisher15,93031.06%
|
|Grant Robertson6,70713.08%
|
|Dave Vasey1,5182.96%
|
|Dave Joslin9581.87%
|
|Glen Smith (Mar.)6381.24%
||
|Paul Steckle
|-
|bgcolor=whitesmoke|Kitchener Centre
||
|Karen Redman21,26447.13%
|
|Thomas Ichim12,41227.51%
|
|Richard Walsh-Bowers8,71719.32%
|
|Karol Vesely2,4505.43%
|
|
|
|Mark Corbiere (Ind.)2770.61%
||
|Karen Redman
|-
|bgcolor=whitesmoke|Kitchener—Conestoga
||
|Lynn Myers17,81942.29%
|
|Frank Luellau14,90335.37%
|
|Len Carter6,62315.72%
|
|Kris Stapleton2,7936.63%
|
|
|
|
||
|Lynn Myers
|-
|bgcolor=whitesmoke|Kitchener—Waterloo
||
|Andrew Telegdi28,01548.12%
|
|Steve Strauss17,15529.47%
|
|Edwin Laryea9,26715.92%
|
|Pauline Richards3,2775.63%
|
|Frank Ellis3790.65%
|
|Ciprian Mihalcea (Ind.)1240.21%
||
|Andrew Telegdi
|-
|rowspan=3 bgcolor=whitesmoke|Oxford
|rowspan=3 |
|rowspan=3 |Murray Coulter14,01130.52%
|rowspan=3 |
|rowspan=3 |Dave Mackenzie20,60644.89%
|rowspan=3 |
|rowspan=3 |Zoé Dorcas Kunschner6,67314.54%
|rowspan=3 |
|rowspan=3 |Irene Tietz1,9514.25%
|rowspan=3 |
|rowspan=3 |Leslie Bartley1,5343.34%
|
|James Bender (Mar.)794 1.73%
|rowspan=3 |
|rowspan=3 |John Finlay†
|-
|
|Alex Kreider (CAP)108 0.24%
|-
|
|Kaye Sargent (Libert.)226 0.49%
|-
|bgcolor=whitesmoke|Perth—Wellington
|
|Brian Innes15,03233.42%
||
|Gary Ralph Schellenberger18,87941.97%
|
|Robert Roth7,02715.62%
|
|John Cowling2,7706.16%
|
|Irma Nicolette Devries1,2732.83%
|
|
||
|Gary Schellenberger
|-
|bgcolor=whitesmoke|Wellington—Halton Hills
|
|Bruce Hood19,17338.21%
||
|Mike Chong21,47942.81%
|
|Noel Duignan5,97411.91%
|
|Brent Bouteiller2,7255.43%
|
|Pat Woode8261.65%
|
|
| colspan=2 align="center"|new district
|}

Notes

References

Midwestern